The Municipality of Dobrova–Polhov Gradec is a municipality in Slovenia. Its administrative seat is Dobrova.

History
Originally, according to the Establishment of Municipalities and Municipal Boundaries Act that came into effect on 1 January 1995, the municipality also included the town of Horjul and was named the Municipality of Dobrova–Horjul–Polhov Gradec. After a ruling by the Slovene Constitutional Court, the local community of the town of Horjul gained its own municipality in 1998, named the Municipality of Horjul.

Settlements
In addition to the municipal seat of Dobrova, the municipality also includes the following settlements:

 Babna Gora
 Belica
 Brezje pri Dobrovi
 Briše pri Polhovem Gradcu
 Butajnova
 Črni Vrh
 Dolenja Vas pri Polhovem Gradcu
 Draževnik
 Dvor pri Polhovem Gradcu
 Gabrje
 Hrastenice
 Hruševo
 Komanija
 Log pri Polhovem Gradcu
 Osredek pri Dobrovi
 Planina nad Horjulom
 Podreber
 Podsmreka
 Polhov Gradec
 Praproče
 Pristava pri Polhovem Gradcu
 Razori
 Rovt
 Selo nad Polhovim Gradcem
 Šentjošt nad Horjulom
 Setnica
 Setnik
 Smolnik
 Srednja Vas pri Polhovem Gradcu
 Srednji Vrh
 Stranska Vas
 Šujica

Notable people
Notable people that were born or lived in the Municipality of Dobrova–Polhov Gradec include:
Emil Adamič (1877–1936), composer
Cardinal Aloysius Ambrozic (1930–2011), archbishop of Toronto
James Trobec (1838–1921), bishop of Saint Cloud, Minnesota

References

External links

Municipality of Dobrova–Polhov Gradec on Geopedia
Dobrova-Polhov Gradec municipal site 

 
Dobrova-Polhov Gradec
1994 establishments in Slovenia